Equestrian competitions at the Beijing 2008 Summer Olympics were held from 9 August to 21 August at the Hong Kong Sports Institute and Sheung Yue River in Hong Kong. It was the second time that the equestrian events were hosted by a member of the IOC other than the member hosting the main games (although this time the events were technically held in the same country as the main games). Unlike 1956, however, the equestrian events were part of the main games, and were held within the same period.

Events 

6 sets of medals were awarded in the following events:
 individual dressage
 team dressage
 individual jumping
 team jumping
 individual eventing
 team eventing

Qualification 

Each event has its own qualification rules, but generally rely on FEI rankings.

Dressage qualification
For the team competition there were a total of 10 quota spots and as many composite as qualify.  Three team spots were awarded at the 2006 FEI World Equestrian Games.  In addition 7 team spots were awarded at regional competitions (Europe: 3, Americas: 2, Asia: 2).  In addition, should a country have three athletes qualified in the individual competition, they will be considered a team and allowed to compete as a composite team.  Five teams qualified under this scheme.

For the individual competition, 50 spots were allocated as follows.  Thirty spots were awarded to the athletes who qualified as teams above.  In addition, the highest ranked rider from each of seven geographic regions and the host nation qualify.  Then the top twelve riders based on rank FEI rank who had not otherwise qualified are given spots.

Jumping qualification
A country may send up to five riders if it qualified for the team competition, two otherwise.  Similar to Dressage, teams of five riders were qualified at either the World Equestrian Games, a region competition, or through a composite spot.  The WEG awarded five spots, the regions eight (Americas: 2, Europe: 2, Asia: 4), and two composite teams qualified.  For the individual competition there were a total of 73 spot allocated as follows: 45 team member, 1 host nation, 7 regional, and 22 at-large.

Eventing qualification

Officials
Appointment of officials was as follows:

Dressage
  Gotthilf Riexinger (Ground Jury President)
  Jean-Michel Roudier (Ground Jury Member)
  Ghislain Fouarge (Ground Jury Member)
  Leif Törnblad (Ground Jury Member)
  Gary Rockwell (Ground Jury Member)
  Minako Furuoka-Hashimoto (Ground Jury Member)
  Barnabas Mandi (Ground Jury Member)
  Mariëtte Withages (Technical Delegate)

Jumping
 Hanno Dohn (Ground Jury President)
  David M. Distler (Ground Jury Member)
  Jean-Loup Caplain (Ground Jury Member)
  Chang Kyoo Yang (Ground Jury Member)
  Olaf Petersen (Technical Delegate)

Eventing
  Martin Plewa (Ground Jury President)
  Marilyn Payne (Ground Jury Member)
  Christian Landolt (Ground Jury Member)
  Giuseppe Della Chiesa (Technical Delegate)
  Andrew Griffiths (Technical Delegate Assistant)

Competition schedule 

All times are Hong Kong Time (UTC+8).

Medal summary

Medal table

Medalists

Venue 

The equestrian competitions were held apart from the main games in Hong Kong, which is a separate member to the IOC. This was because Hong Kong has established a huge horse racing industry. Additionally, there were already some stabling sites for horses within Hong Kong, hence less construction was needed to facilitate the equestrian sports required by the Olympics.

There were two main equestrian venues: Hong Kong Sports Institute (adjacent to Sha Tin Racecourse) and the Beas River Country Club. The Sports Institute held the main competition arena, which included an 80 × 100 meter stadium will all-weather footing and seating for 18,000. The Beas River Country Club was the site of the cross-country phase of eventing, which was held on the golf course.

Weather 

Hong Kong is known to have hot and humid weather with typhoons being common.  This includes a mean air temperature of 28.4 °C (83.1 °F) with 82% humidity, making it even more inclement than Athens (mean temperature of 27.6 °C (81.6 °F), humidity 48%) and Atlanta (26 °C (78 °F), 75% humidity).

Some competitors made it clear that they believed that it would be unfair to work their horses in such weather. Swiss dressage rider Sylvia Ikle was one such rider, and the Swiss decided not to send a dressage team because they would have had little chance of success without her.

To combat the heat, the horses were transported from the airport in Hong Kong to the stabling facilities in air-conditioned vans. The stables are all air-conditioned as well, at a temperature of 20 °C (68 °F). For the first time in history, there was also an indoor arena for training that was also air-conditioned. Misting fans were placed under tents at both venues to cool off horses that worked outside. There were also vast quantities of ice water available. There was a veterinary clinic on site, which tested the horses' urine several times to ensure they were all properly hydrated.

The cross-country course was also designed with a shorter, alternate route to be used if the heat and humidity warranted it. The show jumping was held under lights at night to avoid the heat. The footing is made of high tensile fibers and quartz sand, which has a great ability to absorb water, so that any rain should have minimal effect on the footing used for dressage and show jumping competitions.

Courses 

The show jumping courses (both Grand Prix and the eventing stadium phase) were designed by Leopoldo Palacios of Venezuela and Steve Stephens of the USA. Michael Etherington-Smith of Great Britain designed the cross-country course.

Participation 
More than 200 horses from 41 nations competed.
Dressage: 13 teams of 3 riders each, and 10 individuals.
Eventing: 5 riders per team, with only 3 scores counting.

See also
 Equestrian at the 2008 Summer Paralympics

References 

Beijing 2008
Beijing 2008 Equestrian
Federation Equestre Internationale
FEI Official Competition Timetable

External links 

 Latest Equestrian News & Results from Beijing 2008
Equestrian – Official Results Book

 
2008 Summer Olympics events
2008
International sports competitions hosted by Hong Kong
2008 in Hong Kong sport
Equestrian sports competitions in Hong Kong
2008 in equestrian